Warlords is computer wargame released in 1990, and the first release in the Warlords video game series. It was created by Steve Fawkner and was developed by Strategic Studies Group (SSG).

Gameplay
Warlords featured eight different clans battling for the control of the mythical land of Illuria: Sirians, Storm Giants, Grey Dwarves, Orcs of Kor, Elvallie, Horse Lords, Selentines, and Lord Bane. Each clan could either be controlled by the computer or by a human player, allowing up to eight participants taking turns in hot seat play. Gameplay consisted of moving units, attacking opponent units or cities, adjusting production in cities, and moving hero units to explore ruins, temples, libraries, and to discover allies, relics, and other items. The goal of the game was to conquer the land of Illuria by capturing or razing at least two thirds of the cities in the land.

Reception
Warlords reached sales above 50,000 units.

Reviewers cited the basic sound and average graphics of the game, compensated by simple user interface and "high dollar-to-play value". Computer Gaming World favorably cited the sophisticated computer opponents, and concluded that the game "has everything to offer the strategy gamer who has a taste for a bit of the fantasy genre", especially those who enjoyed Empire or Reach for the Stars. The magazine named the game and Command HQ as its 1991 Wargames of the Year. In a 1993 survey of pre 20th-century strategy games the magazine gave the game three stars out of five, stating that it was "eminently playable".

Warlords was named the 67th best computer game ever by PC Gamer UK in 1997. The editors called it "one of the most revolutionary multi-player experiences of the Nineties."

Reviews
Amiga Action - May, 1991
ASM (Aktueller Software Markt) - Mar, 1991
CU Amiga - May, 1991
Computer Gaming World - Apr, 1991

References

External links
Warlords at MobyGames
Warlords at Hall Of Light
Review in Compute!

1990 video games
Amiga games
Classic Mac OS games
Computer wargames
DOS games
Multiplayer hotseat games
Strategic Studies Group games
Turn-based strategy video games
Video games developed in Australia
Warlords (video game series)